Vedanta can refer to:
The Hindu philosophy, Vedanta
Upanishads
The mining and minerals group, Vedanta Resources
 Or its Indian subsidiary, Vedanta Limited 
The university, Vedanta University